Thuja occidentalis, also known as northern white-cedar, eastern white-cedar, or arborvitae, is an evergreen coniferous tree, in the cypress family Cupressaceae, which is native to eastern Canada and much of the north-central and northeastern United States. It is widely cultivated as an ornamental plant.

Common names 
Its additional common names include swamp cedar, American arborvitae, and eastern arborvitae. The name arborvitae is particularly used in the horticultural trade in the United States; it is Latin for 'tree of life' – due to the supposed medicinal properties of the sap, bark, and twigs. It is sometimes called white-cedar (hyphenated) or whitecedar (one word) to distinguish it from Cedrus, a distantly related genus of trees also known as cedars.

Description
The tree is often stunted or prostrate in less favorable locations. The bark is red-brown, furrowed and peels in narrow, longitudinal strips.
Northern white cedar has fan-like branches and scaly leaves.

They contain about eight seeds each. The branches may take root if the tree falls.

Taxonomy
The species was first described by Carl Linnaeus in 1753. Over 30 synonyms are listed in Kew's Plants of the World Online database.

Distribution
Northern white cedar is native to an area in the southern part of eastern Canada and the adjacent part of the northern United States. It extends from southeastern Manitoba east throughout the Great Lakes region and into Ontario, Québec, New York, Vermont, New Hampshire, Maine, Prince Edward Island, New Brunswick, and Nova Scotia. Isolated populations occur in west-central Manitoba, and to the south in Massachusetts, Connecticut, Ohio, and Illinois and in the Appalachian Mountains of Kentucky, Tennessee, North Carolina, Pennsylvania, Maryland, Virginia, and West Virginia. In Canada, its range reaches the Arctic treeline and the southern tip of Hudson Bay.

Ecology

Northern white cedar grows naturally in wet forests, being particularly abundant in coniferous swamps, where other larger and faster-growing trees cannot compete successfully. It also occurs on other sites with reduced tree competition, such as cliffs. Although not currently listed as endangered, wild white cedar populations are threatened in many areas by high deer numbers; deer find the soft evergreen foliage a very attractive winter food and strip it rapidly.
Northern white cedars can be  very long-lived trees in certain conditions, with notably old specimens growing on cliffs where they are inaccessible to deer and wildfire. As of 2008, the oldest known living specimen was 1,141 years old, but a dead specimen with 1,653 growth rings has been found. Despite their age, these very old trees are small and stunted due to the difficult growing conditions. These individuals' long lifespans have been attributed to their slow growth and their ability to survive when different sections of the tree are damaged or killed. The Witch Tree, a T. occidentalis growing out of a cliff face on Lake Superior in Minnesota, was described by the French explorer Sieur de la Verendrye as being a mature tree in 1731; it is still alive today.

Specimens found growing on cliff faces in southern Ontario are the oldest trees in Eastern North America and all of Canada, having achieved ages in excess of 1,653 years.

Uses
Thuja occidentalis is a tree with important uses in traditional Ojibwe culture. Honoured with the name Nookomis Giizhik (Grandmother Cedar), the tree is the subject of sacred legends and is considered a gift to humanity for its myriad of uses, among them crafts, construction, and medicine. It is one of the four plants of the Ojibwe medicine wheel, associated with the north. The foliage is rich in vitamin C and is believed to be the annedda, which cured the scurvy of Jacques Cartier and his party in the winter of 1535–1536. Due to the presence of the neurotoxic compound thujone, internal use can be harmful if used for prolonged periods or while pregnant.
It is commercially used for rustic fencing and posts, lumber, poles, shingles, and in the construction of log cabins. It is the preferred wood for the structural elements, such as ribs and planking, of birchbark canoes and the planking of wooden canoes.

The essential oil within the plant has been used for cleansers, disinfectants, hair preparations, insecticides, liniment, room sprays, and soft soaps. The Ojibwa reportedly made a soup from the inner bark of the soft twigs. Others have used the twigs to make teas to relieve constipation and headache.

Cultivation

T. occidentalis is widely used as an ornamental tree, particularly for screens and hedges, in gardens, parks, and cemeteries. Over 300 cultivars exist, showing great variation in colour, shape, and size, with some of the more common ones being 'Degroot's Spire', 'Ellwangeriana', 'Hetz Wintergreen', 'Lutea', 'Rheingold', 'Smaragd' (or 'Emerald Green'), 'Techny', and 'Wareana'. It was introduced into Europe as early as 1540.
These cultivars have gained the Royal Horticultural Society's Award of Garden Merit:

'Danica',
'Golden Tuffet'
'Holmstrup',
'Rheingold',
'Smaragd'.

References

External links

 
 University of Michigan at Dearborn: Native American Ethnobotany of Thuja occidentalis
 Borealforest.org: Thuja occidentalis

occidentalis
Trees of Eastern Canada
Trees of the Eastern United States
Plants described in 1753
Taxa named by Carl Linnaeus
Garden plants of North America
Ornamental trees
Medicinal plants of North America
Plants used in traditional Native American medicine